Nabib Newaj Jibon (born 17 August 1990) is a Bangladeshi professional footballer who plays as a striker for Bangladesh Premier League club Abahani Limited Dhaka, which he captains, and also the Bangladesh national team.

Club career

Early career
Jibon's career started in 2006, when he played the JFA Cup U-16 tournament, his impressive performance during the competition earned him a place in the three month long Bangladesh U-17 national camp. However, he could not make it to the final squad. In 2007, he made his pioneer league debut with Noakhali Football Academy and finished the season as top scorer with 11 goals. The following year he played in the second division with Ashulia based, Gazir Char Club, but his time their did not go well as the club didn’t have enough players to compete for promotion. Jibon then roamed all over the country to display his skills at different district leagues, including Khulna, and also in Chittagong, with Chittagong Mohammedan SC in 2009.

In 2010, Jibon made his first division debut with Uttar Baridhara Club. In 2012 the Bangladesh Championship League was introduced, as the country's professional second tier league, and after finishing runners up during the league's inaugural campaign, Uttar Baridhara earned promotion to the Bangladesh Premier League in 2013. Jibon was an integral part of the team, scoring 13 goals in just 11 matches. He attracted the interest of many top flight clubs after that season, and ended up joining Team BJMC. During his first year at the club, Jibon did not get a chance to play due to binding rules. However, during his second year he managed to get 5 goals and 10 assists out of 18 matches. He also spent time on loan at Dhaka Mohammedan in 2015, for the 2015 Sheikh Kamal International Cup, the same year he made his Bangladesh national team debut.

Abahani Limited Dhaka
On 1 January 2017, Jibon got his big move to Dhaka giants Abahani Limited Dhaka, under coach György Kottán. He won the league title during his second year at the club. His first two seasons at the club, Jibon managed to get limited game time, with foreign strikers occupying the forward line. However, after the appointment of Mário Lemos, during the 2018–19 season, Jibon was converted into a false nine, behind striking duo- Sunday Chizoba and Kervens Belfort. He thrived while playing in the new position, scoring 16 goals and attaining 6 assists during the league season. His best performance that season came against Rahmatganj MFS, when he managed to score a hattrick. The 2019 AFC Cup saw Abahani become the first Bangladeshi club to reach the knockouts of the competition. Jibon scored twice during the group stages, and his goals against Minerva Punjab also earned him AFC recognition. During the knockout match against North Korean side April 25 SC, Jibon also found the net as Abahani won the game 4–3.

International career
Jibon made his senior debut against Kyrgyzstan during 2018 FIFA World Cup qualification match in 2015.He scored his first international goal against Sri Lanka in 2016 Bangabandhu Cup.

International Goals

International

Olympic Team

National Team
Scores and results list Bangladesh's goal tally first.

Career statistics

International

Club

Honours

Club
Abahani Limited
 Bangladesh Premier League: 2017–18'''

References

Living people
1990 births
Bangladeshi footballers
Bangladesh international footballers
Association football forwards
Uttar Baridhara SC players
Team BJMC players
Mohammedan SC (Dhaka) players
Abahani Limited (Dhaka) players
Bangladesh Football Premier League players
South Asian Games bronze medalists for Bangladesh
South Asian Games medalists in football